David Hall Hodges (born December 5, 1978) is an American songwriter and record producer from Little Rock, Arkansas. He was a studio contributor to the rock band Evanescence from 1999–2002. He has since had success co-writing and co-producing for various pop, pop rock and country artists, including Kelly Clarkson, Celine Dion, Daughtry, Backstreet Boys, Avril Lavigne, David Archuleta, Christina Aguilera, Carrie Underwood, Jessie James, 5 Seconds of Summer, and Tim McGraw.

Career

1999–2002: Evanescence
Hodges joined Evanescence in late 1999 and made their Origin demo CD and their debut album, Fallen, with bandmates Amy Lee and Ben Moody.  The band's first single, "Bring Me to Life," went to No. 1 on multiple charts, including the Billboard Top 40, and catapulted the band into an international spotlight.  Fallen was certified platinum within weeks of its release in March 2003 and has gone on to sell over 16 million copies worldwide.  In 2004, Hodges took home two Grammy awards with the band for Best Hard Rock Performance and Best New Artist.

2003–2007: Trading Yesterday and The Age of Information
After the Evanescence album Fallen was completed, Hodges left the band.  Back in Little Rock, he started a band in 2003 called Trading Yesterday. The band, which consisted of Hodges (vocals, guitar and keyboard/piano), Colbert (drums) and Steven McMorran (bass), released a demo CD called The Beauty and the Tragedy on May 15, 2004.  Within weeks, they signed a record deal with Epic Records and moved to Los Angeles, California to record their major label album.  The album was finished during the first half of 2005 and the single "One Day" was released on the soundtrack to the movie Stealth.  In 2006, Trading Yesterday parted ways with Epic Records and the album, tentatively titled More Than This, was shelved.  After six years, More Than This was independently released in September 2011.

In August 2007, after parting ways with Epic, Hodges and McMorran started a new band called The Age of Information with collaborators Josh Dunahoo and Will Hunt.  The band evolved from the acoustic sound of Trading Yesterday to something more electronic.  The EP Everything is Broken was released on September 11, 2007.

2004–2010: Initial songwriting success, Warner Bros solo project, Avox, and Arrows to Athens
While busy working on his own music, Hodges was also writing and producing songs for various artists. Hodges worked with artist Kelly Clarkson along with former Evanescence bandmate Ben Moody on songs from her album Breakaway ("Because of You" and "Addicted"). Clarkson's second album sold more than 12 million copies and Hodges' work was awarded the 2007 BMI Song of the Year. "Because of You" went on to be covered by Reba McEntire & Clarkson for McEntire's duets album Reba: Duets. Clarkson's version was a Billboard Top 40 No. 1, and Reba's duet version peaked at No. 2 on the Hot Country Songs, garnering Hodges BMI Pop and Country Awards respectively.

In 2007 he worked with Celine Dion ("This Time") and the Backstreet Boys ("Something That I Already Know"). In July 2008, it was announced that Hodges had been signed by Warner Bros. Records as a solo artist. With Warner, The Rising (EP) was released digitally on August 11, 2009. In 2008, Hodges had a hit as writer and producer for American Idol season seven runner up David Archuleta for his song "Crush." The song reached number 2 on the Billboard Hot 100. Hodges also wrote the single "What About Now" on Daughtry's debut album, which sold over 5 million copies to date. Hodges took home BMI pop awards for both "Crush" and "What About Now" in 2010. Hodges also co-wrote "Open Up Your Eyes" and "Supernatural" with Daughtry for their second album Leave this Town. That record went on to sell over a million copies.

After Reba McEntire's "Because of You" duet, Hodges' next step into country music was with Carrie Underwood when he co-wrote "What Can I Say" with her for her third album Play On, which went to No. 1 on the Country Billboard Charts and sold over 2 million copies.  Hodges also co-wrote gold certified pop hit "Wanted" for Jessie James, along with "Circadian," "Hard To Believe," and "Rapid Eye Movement" for David Cook's second record This Loud Morning.

In fall of 2010, Hodges released a new project with longtime friend John Campbell entitled Avox.  The album The Fragile World is a collection of symphonic and electronic instrumental tracks.  In October 2011, Hodges released an album entitled Kings & Thieves with the band Arrows to Athens, composed of Hodges and guitarist Steven Solomon.  Additionally in 2010, Hodges wrote with Carrie Underwood and Hillary Lindsey, this time for the end title song in the latest Chronicles of Narnia film.  The song was called "There's a Place for Us," and was nominated for a Golden Globe Award for best original song in a motion picture.

2011–2015: Continued songwriting success, Third and Verse
In May 2011, Christina Perri released her debut album Lovestrong.  Hodges helped produce and co-wrote many songs on the album, including singles "Arms" and "Distance" featuring Jason Mraz. That summer, Hodges' song "Stitch by Stitch" was performed on the first season of The Voice by winner Javier Colon as his first single along with "As Long As We Got Love" featuring Natasha Bedingfield as Colon's second single. "Stitch by Stitch" immediately went to No. 1 on the iTunes pop charts.  Also in 2011, Hodges and songwriting partner Steven Solomon wrote many songs together with Tristan Prettyman for her Capitol Record's album Cedar and Gold. He also wrote "The Woman I Love" with Jason Mraz which was released on his album Love is a Four Letter Word. By late 2011, Hodges was back in with Perri to write for the hit Twilight film Breaking Dawn. The song "A Thousand Years" went on to sell over 6 million copies worldwide and the soundtrack that was certified gold.

Starting in March 2012, Hodges co-produced Avril Lavigne's self-titled album with friend and Nickelback frontman Chad Kroeger. The album's first single "Here's to Never Growing Up" has sold over 2 million copies worldwide and is certified platinum in the US. In addition to "Here's to Never Growing Up", Hodges also helped write the album's other singles "Rock n Roll", "Let Me Go" featuring Chad Kroeger, and "Hello Kitty", which have all had success in various international markets. Additionally in 2012, Hodges began writing with Tonic frontman Emerson Hart for Hart's solo record Beauty in Disrepair. Hodges produced the album and co-wrote many songs including "The Best That I Can Give" and "Hurricane."

2012 also marked the end of Hodges' seven-year publishing relationship with EMI as the company was bought by Sony/ATV. Later that year, Hodges signed with Kobalt Music Group and started his own publishing joint-venture with them called Third and Verse. The first writer signed to Third and Verse was writer/producer Steven Solomon. Third and Verse has gone on to sign Gabe Dixon, Cameron Walker, Jake Scott, David Ryan Harris, and others. The company's success ranges from placements in films and commercials to cuts in multiple genres including pop, country, and rock.

In August 2013, Hodges's single with Carrie Underwood entitled "See You Again" went to No. 1 at country radio. The song was certified platinum and is part of her multi-platinum album Blown Away. He also wrote Colbie Caillat's "When The Darkness Comes" for Sony Screen Gem's film The Mortal Instruments. In October 2014, David also helped in writing the song "Faith" with musician and author Lacey Sturm for her album Life Screams. In 2015, he co-wrote "The Girl You Think I Am" with Carrie Underwood. The song was released on her new album Storyteller which was the No. 2 album in the US the same week the 5 Seconds of Summer album was released, which took the No. 1 spot. Hodges co-wrote and produced a song on 5 Seconds of Summer's second album. The song, "Jet Black Heart", was released in August 2015, in anticipation for the album Sounds Good Feels Good street date in October, and it quickly became a single. Hodges has since released songs with and co-wrote music for Keith Urban, Gavin DeGraw, Christina Aguilera, Tim McGraw, Phillip Phillips, Blake Shelton, Dan + Shay, Hey Violet, Tonight Alive, Steven Tyler, Molly Kate Kestner, Hunter Hayes, Josh Groban, Weezer, and more.

Hodges is published by Kobalt for the world, and managed by Lucas Keller at Milk & Honey.

Discography

Solo
Musical Demonstrations Part 1 (2000)
The Rising EP (2009)
The December Sessions, Vol. 1 (2011)
Passengers: Weapons EP (2013)
The December Sessions, Vol. 2 (2013)
Passengers: Sirens EP (2014)
The December Sessions, Vol. 3 (2015)
The December Sessions, Vol. 4 (2016)
The December Sessions, Vol. 5 (2017)
Discrepancies in the Recollection of Various Principles / Side A (2019)
Discrepancies in the Recollection of Various Principles / Side B (2019)
In The Round (2021)

Evanescence
Fallen (2003)

Trading Yesterday
The Beauty and the Tragedy (2004)
More Than This (completed 2006, released 2011)

The Age of Information
Everything Is Broken (2007)

Avox
The Fragile World (2010)

Arrows to Athens
Kings & Thieves (2011)
Exile (2016)

Awards
Billboard 2003 – Evanescence – New Group Artist of the Year
Billboard 2003 – Evanescence – Soundtrack Single of the Year
Grammy 2004 – Evanescence – Best New Artist
Grammy 2004 – Evanescence – Best Hard Rock Performance
Grammy 2005 (nomination) – Evanescence – Best Pop Performance
BMI Pop Award 2005 – Evanescence – "Bring Me To Life"
BMI Pop Award 2006 – Evanescence – "My Immortal"
BMI Pop Award 2007 – Kelly Clarkson – "Because of You" – Song of the Year
BMI Country Award 2008 – Reba McEntire – "Because of You"
BMI Pop Award 2010 – David Archuleta – "Crush"
BMI Pop Award 2010 – Daughtry – "What About Now"
BMI Pop Award 2013 – Christina Perri – "A Thousand Years"
Golden Globe Award nomination – Carrie Underwood – "There's a Place For Us"

References

External links

American heavy metal keyboardists
American male singer-songwriters
American rock singers
American rock songwriters
Musicians from Little Rock, Arkansas
Evanescence members
Grammy Award winners
Living people
Writers from Little Rock, Arkansas
American performers of Christian music
1978 births
21st-century American keyboardists
21st-century American singers
Singer-songwriters from Arkansas